Pirola is a surname. Notable people with the name include: 

Davide Pirola (born 2001), Italian professional footballer
Lorenzo Pirola (born 2002), Italian professional footballer
Romano Pirola, Australian pancreatology researcher and gastroenterologist

See also 
 Pirola (disambiguation)